Vie mut kotiin is the debut studio album by Finnish singer Jesse Kaikuranta. It was released on 2 November 2012. Matti Mikkola and Eppu Kosonen served as producers, while Saara Törmä, Hector, Freeman, Paula Vesala and Kaikuranta himself were among the songwriters.

Commercial reception

The album debuted at number one on the Official Finnish Album Chart. Three singles were released: "Vie mut kotiin", "Järjetön rakkaus" and "Näytän sulle rannan".

Track listing

Charts and certifications

Charts

Certifications

References

2012 debut albums
Jesse Kaikuranta albums
Finnish-language albums